Ningthou was a title used for the King of Manipur. The Ningthou was used to refer to the King after the reign of Pakhangba and was a title used until King Pamheiba. The subsequent Sanskritization undertaken by Pamheiba and Shantidas Adhikari changed the title of the King to Maharaja or Raja  though the native name was still used for some Kings (ex. Ningthou Ching-Thang Khomba)

See also
List of Meitei royals
Manipur (princely state)

References

External links

 
Meitei royalty